The 2018 Georgia Secretary of State election was held on November 6, 2018, to elect the Secretary of State of Georgia. It was held concurrently with the 2018 gubernatorial election, as well as elections for the United States Senate and elections for the United States House of Representatives and various state and local elections. Republican Incumbent Secretary of State Brian Kemp chose not to run for re-election in order to run for governor. Since no candidate received the requisite 50 percent of the vote, the top two candidates, Democrat John Barrow and Republican Brad Raffensperger proceeded to a runoff on December 4, 2018. 

At 22.98%, the runoff saw the lowest voter turnout  out of any Georgia statewide election since the senate runoff of 1992.

In the runoff election, Raffensperger unexpectedly flipped rural counties Sumter and Warren, which were reliably Democratic counties that have not voted Republican on the presidential levels since 1972 for Warren, and 2004 for Sumter. However, both counties have been trending Republican in recent elections. Raffensperger also flipped Atlanta suburban counties Cobb and Newton, which have been trending away from Republicans in recent elections. As of 2022, this was the last time Cobb and Newton went Republican in a statewide race in Georgia 

Georgia has been a Republican triplex since 2011, meaning that its governor, attorney general, and secretary of state have all been members of the same party. The state maintained that status following this election, as Republicans won every statewide office. This was the first time in Georgia state history that any statewide executive election went to a second round.

Republican primary

Candidates

Nominee
 Brad Raffensperger, state representative

Eliminated in runoff
 David Belle Isle, Mayor of Alpharetta

Eliminated in primary
 Buzz Brockway, state representative  
 Joshua McKoon, state senator

Declined
 John Albers, state senator
 Steve Gooch, state senator
 Liz Hausmann, Fulton County Commissioner
 Brian Kemp, incumbent secretary of state of Georgia (running for governor)
 Michael Williams, State Senator (running for governor)

Endorsements

First round

Results

Runoff

Polling

Results

Democratic primary

Candidates

Nominee
 John Barrow, former U.S. Representative

Eliminated in primary
 Dee Dawkins-Haigler, former state representative and candidate for the State Senate in 2016
 RJ Hadley, former Rockdale County Tax Commissioner and candidate for U.S. Senate in 2010

Declined
 Teresa Tomlinson, Mayor of Columbus
 David Worley, Georgia State Elections Board member, former Chair of the Democratic Party of Georgia and nominee for GA-06 in 1990

Results

Libertarian convention

Candidates

Nominee
 J. Smythe DuVal, registered nurse and medical I.T. entrepreneur

General election

Predictions

Polling

Results

Runoff

References

External links
Official campaign websites
John Barrow (D) for Secretary of State
Brad Raffensperger (R) for Secretary of State
J. Smythe DuVal (L) for Secretary of State 

Secretary of State
Georgia